Johann Friedrich Alexander of Weid (November 18, 1706 - August 7, 1791) was a German ruler. He was the son of Friedrich Wilhelm of Wied and Luise Charlotte Dohna-Schlobitten. He was Count of Wied-Neuwied from September 17, 1737 to May 29, 1784, when he was elevated to Prince and continued to rule in that capacity until his death on August 8, 1791. He was married to Karoline von Kirchburg. They had three children Frederich Karl of Wied, who succeeded him as Prince, Alexander August of Wied and Sophie Karoline of Wied.

Life
In 1737, after his studies in Strasbourg and Königsberg, he was instrumental in the negotiation of the Vienna peace, which ended the War of the Polish Succession. When the title of prince was offered to him in 1738, however, he declined for financial reasons. In 1739 he married Caroline of Kirchberg (1720-1795), Countess of Sayn-Hachenburg.

During his reign he sought to advance, socially and economically, the small territory of Wied-Neuwied. In the effort to win new citizens for the city of Neuwied, he permitted the establishment of numerous factories and workshops. He also organised a lottery, which allowed players to win houses in today's city dike. His governance was characterised by openness and religious tolerance. In 1750 he also permitted the establishment of the Moravian Church. He promoted the construction of a Mennonite church and a synagogue in Neuwied and wholly implemented the grandfather Frederick III's tolerant religious policy. For this reason, historian Max Braubach has described him as "one of the best representatives of enlightened absolutism in the realm."

As Chairman of the Lower Rhenish-Westphalian Count College, Johann Friedrich Alexander was able to play a role in national politics. His success in mediating the dispute between the Protestant and Catholic Imperial Count led to his elevation to the rank of prince.

References

Family tree of Johann Friedrich Alexander Christian zu Wied
Fürst Johann Friedrich Alexander Christian zu Wied-Neuwied b. 18 Nov 1706 d. 7 Aug 1791: Geneagraphie - Families all over the world
Ancestry Library Edition
Johann Friedrich Alexander von Wied: ein deutscher Reichsgraf in der Politik des 18. Jahrhunderts

1706 births
1791 deaths
Counts of Wied
House of Wied-Neuwied